The Big Vein refers to a  thick seam of bituminous coal discovered in the Georges Creek Valley of Western Maryland in the early 19th century.  This coal vein became famous for its clean-burning low sulfur content that made it ideal for powering ocean steamers, river boats, locomotives, steam mills, and machine shops.

By 1850, almost 30 coal companies were mining the valley, extracting more than 60 million tons of coal between 1854 and 1891.  The Consolidation Coal Company, established in 1864 and headquartered in Cumberland, Maryland became one of the largest bituminous coal companies in the eastern United States and Cumberland had financial connections that reached beyond Washington, D.C. and Baltimore to New York and London.

References
 Brugger, "Maryland: A New Guide to the Old Line State", Johns Hopkins University 1999, 
 Samel Harries, "Coal, Iron, and Oil", B. Bannan 1866 (copyright expired), Full Text Online, page 333.

See also
 Consolidation Coal Company
 Hoffman tunnel

Georges Creek Valley
Coal mining in Appalachia
History of Cumberland, MD-WV MSA
Geography of Allegany County, Maryland
Mining in Maryland